Moedwil is a small town near Swartruggens, North West Province, South Africa. It was the site of a battle during the Second Boer War where for actions during the battle, William Bees was awarded the Victoria Cross.

References

Populated places in the Kgetlengrivier Local Municipality